Cribs Creek is a  long 2nd order tributary to the Rocky River in Anson County, North Carolina.  This is the only stream of this name in the United States.

Variant names
According to the Geographic Names Information System, it has also been known historically as:
Cribbs Creek

Course
Cribs Creek rises in a pond about 0.5 miles southwest of Fountain Hill, North Carolina and then flows northwest to join the Rocky River about 5 miles northeast of Burnsville.

Watershed
Cribs Creek drains  of area, receives about 48.0 in/year of precipitation, has a wetness index of 400.15, and is about 55% forested.

References

Rivers of North Carolina
Rivers of Anson County, North Carolina